The New Jersey Museum of Transportation is a museum dedicated to the collection, preservation, and operation of historic railroad equipment. The organization runs excursion trains on a  narrow gauge tourist railroad named the Pine Creek Railroad. The museum is independently operated as a 501(c)(3) nonprofit organization along with the Allaire Village and is located
in Allaire State Park in New Jersey. The museum runs Easter Bunny Express trains in April, Haunted Halloween trains in October, and Santa Special trains on the weekends in December.

History 
The origins of the New Jersey Museum of Transportation began with the purchase of a Baldwin 0-4-0T engine from the Raritan River Sand Company in 1952 by a pair of railroad enthusiasts. This first engine was named the Pine Creek No. 1
and was eventually sold to the Walt Disney company, where it was overhauled and renamed the #4 Ernest S. Marsh. The engine is still in use today at the Disneyland theme park in Anaheim, California.

Initially a  plot of land on Route 9 in Marlboro was purchased where the railroad was run as a tourist attraction, but in 1952 when the organization was facing large property tax increases the not-for-profit Pine Creek Railroad Division of the New Jersey Museum of Transportation was formed and the operations were moved to its present-day location in Allaire State Park.

While the Pine Creek railroad loop runs adjacent to the abandoned Freehold and Jamesburg Agricultural Railroad that skirts the park (now known as the Edgar Felix Bikeway), it was never part of that rail line right-of-way.

Collection
The following is only a partial listing of equipment that has been or is currently at the Museum.

Grounds

Buildings on the grounds include the Allenwood Station (built by the Pennsylvania Railroad in the early 1940s for use in Allenwood, NJ), the Freneau Station (built by the Jersey Central in the early 1900s on the CNJ Freehold Branch), a Union Newsstand (built circa 1910 in Manasquan, NJ, purchased in 1969), a crossing shanty, a maintenance shop, a heavy equipment building, a car barn (used for storage of rolling stock), as well as an office (Raritan River Railroad #7).

Sunken engines
Further identification of these engines occurred in 2004 when a team of diving and railroad enthusiasts working along with the History Channel production team investigated the engines. After viewing several digital images it was discovered, through the evidence of several artifacts on the engines, that they were Civil War-era Patentee Class 2-2-2T locomotives from between 1850 and 1855.

On September 25, 2004, the New Jersey Museum of Transportation was granted custody of the two engines by U.S. District Judge Joseph Irenas. The museum hopes one day to raise the relics for display and interpretation at the museum.

Notes

References

External links

Allaire State Park

Railroad museums in New Jersey
Heritage railroads in New Jersey
Museums established in 1952
Museums in Monmouth County, New Jersey
1952 establishments in New Jersey
501(c)(3) organizations